In the mathematical discipline of graph theory, the (m,n)-lollipop graph is a special type of graph consisting of a complete graph (clique) on m vertices and a path graph on n vertices, connected with a bridge.

The special case of the (2n/3,n/3)-lollipop graphs are known as graphs which achieve the maximum possible hitting time, cover time and commute time.

See also
 Barbell graph
 Tadpole graph

References

Parametric families of graphs